Our World: Redeemed is the fourth studio album from American Christian rapper Flame, released on March 4, 2008. The album jumped 41 chart positions in one week to hit the No. 1 position in its second week on the CMTA R&B/Hip Hop Chart. The project also debuted at No. 5 on the Billboard Top Gospel Chart. A video was made for the song Joyful Noise. The album has received a Grammy Award nomination for Best Rock or Rap Gospel Album.

Track listing

References

External links
 Our World Redeemed E-Card

2008 albums
Flame (rapper) albums
Cross Movement Records albums
Albums produced by DJ Official